Chagas may refer to:
 Chagas disease
 9483 Chagas, a main-belt asteroid
 a Portuguese-language family name, translating to wounds

People 
 Carlos Chagas (1879–1934), a Brazilian sanitary physician, scientist and bacteriologist
 Carlos Chagas Filho (1910–2000), a Brazilian physician, biologist and scientist
 Evandro Chagas (1905–1940), a Brazilian physician and biomedical scientist
 Gabriel Chagas (born 1944), a Brazilian bridge player
 Manuel Chagas (possibly living), a Portuguese Olympic fencer
 Marco Chagas (born 1956), a Portuguese former professional racing cyclist
 Marinho Chagas (born 1952), a Brazilian former football player
 Walmor Chagas (born 1931), a Brazilian actor
 with compound surnames
 Fernando Chagas Carvalho Neto (born 1952), the Brazilian current Vice-President of Sport Club Internacional
 Francisco Clodoaldo Chagas Ferreira (born 1978), a Brazilian football player
 Pedro Chagas Freitas (living), a Portuguese writer, journalist, writing teacher and public speaker
 Dyanfres Douglas Chagas Matos (born 1987), a Brazilian football player
 António Chagas Rosa (born 1960), a Portuguese composer of contemporary classical music
 Cristian Chagas Tarouco (born 1988), a Brazilian football player
 João Pinheiro Chagas (1863–1925), a Portuguese journalist and politician
 Rodrigo José Queiroz Chagas (born 1973), a Brazilian retired football player
 Martin Andrade Weber Chagas Carvalho (born 1985), a Brazilian retired football player
 with surname Das Chagas
 António das Chagas (1631–1682), a Portuguese Franciscan and ascetical writer
 Diogo das Chagas (c. 1584–c. 1661), a Franciscan friar and Azorean historian
 Luís Gonçalves das Chagas, Baron of Candiota (c. 1815–1894), a Brazilian landowner, military leader and noble
 Ouraci Francisco das Chagas (born 1941), a Brazilian retired football player
 Ana Beatriz Francisco das Chagas (born 1971), a Brazilian volleyball player

Places 
 Carlos Chagas, Minas Gerais, a Brazilian municipality located in the northeast of the state of Minas Gerais

See also 
 Chaga